Gregor Becke (born 12 October 1972 in Salzburg) is an Austrian slalom canoer who competed from the late 1980s to the early 1990s. He finished 33rd in the K-1 event at the 1992 Summer Olympics in Barcelona.

References
 

1972 births
Austrian male canoeists
Canoeists at the 1992 Summer Olympics
Living people
Olympic canoeists of Austria
Sportspeople from Salzburg